Bradford is home to the UK headquarters of:
Aagrah - Asian restaurant chain
BASF - UK subsidiary of the Germany Company formerly CIBA
British Wool Marketing Board - central marketing system for UK fleece wool 
Damart – UK subsidiary of this French company
Farmers Boy - meat subsidiary of Morrisons PLC
Grattan plc - mail order catalogue company
Hallmark Cards - UK subsidiary of this American company
JCT600 - Car dealership company
Morrisons - supermarket retailer
Mumtaz - Asian restaurant chain and food making company
Pace Micro Technology - set top box developer
Safestyle UK - UK's largest independent provider of PVCu double glazed windows, doors, French doors, patio and sliding doors
Seabrook Potato Crisps - potato crisp manufacturers
Telegraph & Argus - daily newspaper
Vanquis Banking Group - financial services group
Yorkshire Building Society - the UK's fourth largest building society
Yorkshire Water - collection, purification and distribution of water

Companies that are major employers but not based in Bradford include:
Marks & Spencer - huge warehouse at the end of the M606 motorway
Next plc - also have a warehouse in the city

References

 
Bradford
Companies